Dolichocephaly (derived from the Ancient Greek δολιχός 'long' and κεφαλή 'head') is a condition where the head is longer than would be expected, relative to its width. In humans, scaphocephaly is a form of dolichocephaly.

Dolichocephalic dogs (such as the Lurcher or German Shepherd) have elongated noses. This makes them vulnerable to fungal diseases of the nose such as aspergillosis. In humans the anterior–posterior diameter (length) of dolichocephaly head is more than the transverse diameter (width).

It can be present in cases of Sensenbrenner syndrome, Crouzon syndrome, Sotos syndrome, CMFTD and Marfan syndrome.

See also
 Brachycephaly
 Cephalic index
 Plagiocephaly

References

External links 

Congenital disorders of musculoskeletal system